Shaken Not Stirred is an album by American pianist David Benoit released 
in 1994, recorded for the GRP label. The album reached #14 on Billboards Jazz 
chart.

Track listing
All tracks written by David Benoit, except as noted.
"Wailea" - 4:29
"I Went to Bat for You" - 4:29
"Any Other Time" (David Benoit, David Pack) - 5:05
"Carmel" - 3:10
"Sparks Flew" - 4:23
"Shaken Not Stirred" - 5:39
"Chi Chi's Eyes" - 4:45
"Days of Old" (David Benoit, Lorraine Feather) - 4:27
"Jacqueline" - 3:31
"Sarah's Theme" - 6:10

 Personnel 
 David Benoit – acoustic piano (1-10), synthesizer programming (1-10), arrangements (1-10), Rhodes (1), Roland Rhodes MK80 (2, 6, 8), synth bass (2, 6), Fender Rhodes (3), electronic percussion (3), conductor (4, 7)
 Peter Sprague – guitar (1, 5)
 Kim Stone - bass (1, 4, 5)
 Joe Peña – bass (2, 6)
 Steve Bailey – bass (3)
 Dave Enos – bass (7, 10), Arco bass (7)
 Tony Morales – drums (1, 4, 5), pencil effects (5)
 Simon Phillips – drums (2, 6)
 George Perilli – drums (3)
 David Anderson – cymbal (7), drums (10)
 Brad Dutz – percussion (3, 7)
 Chris Trujillo – percussion (6)
 Eric Marienthal – alto saxophone (2, 10)
 Tommy Morgan – harmonica (8)
 Morgan Ames – vocals (1), vocal arrangements (1)
 Clydene Jackson – vocals (1)
 Darlene Koldenhoven – vocals (1)
 Carmen Twillie – vocals (1)
 David Pack – vocals (3)
 Kenny Rankin – vocals (8)Orchestrations Missy Hanson – cello (3)
 Larry Corbett – cello (4, 7, 8)
 Douglas Davis – cello (4)
 Susie Katayama – cello (4)
 Armen Ksajikian – cello (4)
 Roger Lebow – cello (4)
 Chuck Berghofer – double bass (4)
 Ami Egglison – double bass (4)
 Richard Feves – double bass (4)
 Susan Ranney – double bass (4)
 Gayle Levant – harp (4, 7, 8)
 Robert Becker – viola (4)
 Denyse Buffum – viola (4)
 Pamela Goldsmith – viola (4)
 Roland Kato – viola (4)
 James Ross – viola (4)
 Evan Wilson – viola (4)
 Vicki Miskolczy – viola (7, 8)
 Israel Baker – violin (4)
 Ron Clark – violin (4)
 Bruce Dukov – violin (4), concertmaster (4)
 Henry Ferber – violin (4)
 Armen Garabedian – violin (4)
 Berj Garabedian – violin (4)
 Endre Granat – violin (4)
 Gwen Heller – violin (4)
 Karen Jones – violin (4)
 Peter Kent – violin (4, 7, 8)
 Ezra Kilger – violin (4)
 Miran Kojian – violin (4)
 Brian Leonard – violin (4)
 Joy Lyle – violin (4)
 Michael Markman – violin (4)
 Ralph Morrison – violin (4)
 Robert Peterson – violin (4)
 Barbara Porter – violin (4)
 Rachel Robinson – violin (4)
 Guillermo Romero – violin (4)
 Anatoly Rosinsky – violin (4)
 Mark Sazer – violin (4)
 John Wittenberg – violin (4)
 Sid Page – violin (7, 8), concertmaster (7, 8)
 Gary Gray – clarinet (4), bass clarinet (4)
 Charles Bolto – clarinet (7)
 Louise Di Tullio – flute (4)
 Valerie King – flute (4)
 Steve Kujala – piccolo flute (4)
 Brice Martin – piccolo flute (4, 7), pan flutes (4), flute (7)
 Joe Meyer – French horn (4)
 James Thatcher – French horn (4)
 Richard Todd – French horn (4)
 Brad Warnaar – French horn (4)
 Steven Holtman – trombone (4)
 Alan Kaplan – trombone (4)
 Robert Payne – trombone (4)
 Rick Baptist – trumpet (4)
 Wayne Bergeron – trumpet (4)
 Gregory Prechel – trumpet (4)
 Norman Pearson – tuba (4)
 Larry Bunker – percussion (4)
 Alan Varvin – percussion (4), timpani (7)
 Bob Zimmitti – percussion (4)

 Production 
 David Benoit – producer 
 Jeffrey Weber – co-producer
 Dave Grusin – executive producer 
 Larry Rosen – executive producer 
 Cara Bridgins – production coordinator 
 Clark Germain – engineer, mixing 
 Mike Brink – second engineer
 David Brock – second engineer
 Randy Festejo – second engineer
 Mark Guilbeault – second engineer
 Bill Winnett – second engineer
 Tim Aller – additional engineer 
 Bill Drescher – additional engineer 
 Ross Pallone – additional engineer 
 Bernie Grundman – mastering 
 Sonny Mediana – production director, art direction 
 Andy Baltimore – creative director
 Alba Acevedo – graphic design 
 Jeff Sedlick – photography Studios'
 Recorded at 29th Street Studio (Torrance, California).
 Mastered at Bernie Grundman Mastering (Hollywood, California).

Charts

References

External links
David Benoit-Shaken Not Stirred at Discogs

1994 albums
GRP Records albums
David Benoit (musician) albums